Reginald Stewart Abbott (born February 4, 1930) is a Canadian former professional ice hockey player. Abbott played three games in the National Hockey League (NHL) with the Montreal Canadiens during the 1952–53 season. The rest of his career, which lasted from 1950 to 1965, was mainly spent in the senior Ontario Hockey Association. Internationally Abbott played for Canadian national team at the 1965 World Championships.

Personal life
As a youth in Winnipeg, Abbott was an outstanding all-round athlete. He played baseball as the second baseman for the provincial champion Rosedales in Manitoba. He also was a near-scratch golfer and a good lacrosse player before dedicating his career to ice hockey in his teens.

Playing career 
Abbott began his professional career with the Victoria Cougars where he spent four seasons. During this time, he played three games in the National Hockey League in 1952–53 for the Montreal Canadiens. During those three games, he did not score any points nor did he earn any penalty minutes. Apart from three games in the American Hockey League with the Pittsburgh Hornets, Abbott would spend the next five seasons playing senior hockey for the Windsor Bulldogs. Afterwards he would play sparingly with the Winnipeg Maroons and the Clinton Comets before retiring. He played for the Canadian National Team in the 1965 World Championships which finished fourth.

Awards and achievements 
1949: Turnbull Cup (MJHL) Championship
1949: Abbott Cup Championship (1949)
1950: MJHL Scoring Leader
1950: MJHL Goal Scoring Leader
1950: MJHL First All-Star Team
1951: President's Cup (PCHL) Championship
1964: Allan Cup Championship
 Honoured Member of the Manitoba Hockey Hall of Fame

Career statistics

Regular season and playoffs

International

References

External links

1930 births
Living people
Brandon Wheat Kings players
Canadian expatriate ice hockey players in the United States
Canadian ice hockey centres
Clinton Comets players
Montreal Canadiens players
Ontario Hockey Association Senior A League (1890–1979) players
Pittsburgh Hornets players
Ice hockey people from Winnipeg
Victoria Cougars (1949–1961) players
Windsor Bulldogs (OHA) players
Winnipeg Maroons players